Angela Bürgis (born 3 November 1979) is a Swiss former professional tennis player.

Bürgis was a member of Switzerland's 1996 Fed Cup team, appearing in five ties as a doubles player. She won three of her five doubles rubbers, two of which came while partnering Martina Hingis and included a win over Croatia's Mirjana Lucic and Iva Majoli.

On the professional tour she reached a best singles ranking of 424 and twice featured in the qualifying draw of the WTA Tour tournament in Zurich, but otherwise spent her career on the ITF Circuit, where she won a singles title at Tortosa in 1996.

Following her professional career, Bürgis played varsity tennis in the United States at the University of Minnesota, earning selection in the All-Big Ten Team in both 2003 and 2004.

ITF finals

Singles: 2 (1–1)

Doubles: 4 (1–3)

See also
List of Switzerland Fed Cup team representatives

References

External links
 
 
 

1979 births
Living people
Swiss female tennis players
Minnesota Golden Gophers athletes
College women's tennis players in the United States